Catherine A. Rombeau is an American politician of the Democratic Party, who is a State Representative for Hillsborough County's 7th district in the New Hampshire House of Representatives. Her 37-vote victory in a special election marked the first flip for Democrats in the 2021 United States state legislative elections, and made her only the second Democrat to be elected to the state house from the town of Bedford, a historically Republican town.

Before being elected to the state legislature, Rombeau was a member of the Bedford City Council.

Electoral history

References

Living people
People from Bedford, New Hampshire
Women state legislators in New Hampshire
Democratic Party members of the New Hampshire House of Representatives
21st-century American politicians
21st-century American women politicians
Year of birth missing (living people)